Lisa Alisa is an artist based in New York City.

She is known for provocative graphic images of young women that bear a strong self-portrait resemblance. Lisa Alisa's work addresses issues of independence, femininity, youth, environment and natural conservation.

She has been published and exhibited worldwide.

Exhibitions
2013
 EGOIST first capsule collection of top wear for men and women

2012
 “My Little Pony Project”, group exhibition. Los Angeles, New York , USA
 300 Jahre Friedrich der Grosse, Konigliche Porzellan-Manufaktur Berlin. Berlin, Germany
 "Cage in Search of a Bird" project, Mercedes Benz Fashion Week Berlin. Berlin, Germany
 Solo show - Graphite. May 2011
 Graphite for Japan Silent Auction. March 31, 2011
 SWEET STREETS fundraiser: Japan LA 7320 1/2 Melrose Ave. Los Angeles, CA 90046 March 19, 2011
 Collaboration Project with Yuki Itoda for Moscow Museum of Modern Arts. 2nd Moscow Biennale for Young Art. July 2010
 October 24, 2008 - Ad Hoc Art Gallery, Brooklyn, NY, USA
 May 18, 2008 - Design Festa, Tokyo, Japan
 April 12, 2008 - Project Gallery, Los Angeles, CA, USA
 February 16, 2008 - Apama Mackey Gallery, Houston, TX, USA
 February 8, 2008 - Ad Hoc Art Gallery, Brooklyn, NY, USA
 28 June 2007 - July 14 at The Tower Music Festival, London, UK

External links
 lisa-alisa.com
 Hoard Magazine interview with Lisa Alisa, July 2004
 GUU Press Magazine interview with Lisa Alisa, February 2007
 Vice Polska interview with Lisa Alisa (in Polish), September 2010

Artists from New York (state)
Year of birth missing (living people)
Living people